Mansour Al Haj Saeed is a Palestinian football manager and former player. He is currently unattached, after last managing MC Oran in the Algerian Ligue Professionnelle 1.

Managerial career
Mansour Hadj Saïd has long lived in Algeria, he has led only the Algerian clubs.

On October 2, 2011, Hadj Mansour was terminated from his role as head coach of MC Oran after leading the club to the bottom of the table and managing just 2 points from the club's first 4 games of the 2011–12 season.

His first team in Algeria was ES Sétif, US Chaouia, USM El Harrach, MC Oran, USM Blida, JSM Béjaia, ASO Chlef, CA Bordj Bou Arréridj, CRB Ain Fakroun, AS Khroub.

Honours
 Won the Algerian Ligue Professionnelle 1 with US Chaouia in 1994

References

External links
 Said Hadj Mansour profile - eurosport.fr

Living people
Palestinian football managers
Expatriate football managers in Algeria
Palestinian expatriates in Algeria
ES Sétif managers
MC Oran managers
USM Alger managers
1948 births